Jiří Novák and Petr Pála were the defending champions, but chose not to participate.

Seeds

Draw

Draw

References
 Main Draw

Croatia Open Umag - Doubles